G'Angelo Hancock (born July 27, 1997) is an American Greco-Roman wrestler. He won one of the bronze medals in the 97 kg event at the 2021 World Wrestling Championships held in Oslo, Norway. At the 2020 Pan American Wrestling Championships held in Ottawa, Canada, he won the gold medal in the 97 kg event. He is also a silver medalist at the 2019 Pan American Games held in Lima, Peru. He represented the United States at the 2020 Summer Olympics in Tokyo, Japan.

Hancock signed with the WWE in August 2022 as a performer under the ring name Tavion Heights.

Career 

In 2016, he competed at the United States Olympic Team Trials hoping to represent the United States at the 2016 Summer Olympics in Rio de Janeiro, Brazil. He finished in third place in the 98 kg event.

Hancock won one of the bronze medals in the 98 kg event at the 2017 Pan American Wrestling Championships held in Lauro de Freitas, Brazil. He also competed in the 98 kg event at the 2017 World Wrestling Championships held in Paris, France without winning a medal. He won his first match against Fatih Başköy and lost his next match against Artur Aleksanyan. Aleksanyan went on to win the gold medal. At the 2018 World Wrestling Championships held in Budapest, Hungary, he was eliminated in his first match in the 97 kg event.

In 2019, he won the silver medal in his event at the Pan American Wrestling Championships held in Buenos Aires, Argentina. In that same year, he represented the United States at the Pan American Games held in Lima, Peru and he won the silver medal in the 97 kg event. In the final, he lost against Gabriel Rosillo of Cuba. He also competed in the 97 kg event at the 2019 World Wrestling Championships held in Nur-Sultan, Kazakhstan where he was eliminated in his second match by Mélonin Noumonvi of France.

He competed in the 97 kg event at the 2020 Summer Olympics held in Tokyo, Japan. He won his first match against Mikheil Kajaia of Serbia and he was then eliminated in his next match by Tadeusz Michalik of Poland.

After qualifying for Team USA for the 2022 World Championships at 97 kg at Final X in New York City, Hancock announced his retirement on August 9, 2022 and was replaced on Team USA by Braxton Amos.

Major results

References

External links 

 
 
 
 

Living people
1997 births
Place of birth missing (living people)
American male sport wrestlers
Pan American Games medalists in wrestling
Pan American Games silver medalists for the United States
Wrestlers at the 2019 Pan American Games
Medalists at the 2019 Pan American Games
Pan American Wrestling Championships medalists
Wrestlers at the 2020 Summer Olympics
Olympic wrestlers of the United States
World Wrestling Championships medalists
20th-century American people
21st-century American people